A murderer is a person who commits murder

Murderer or Murderers may also refer to:

 Murderer (film), a 2009 Hong Kong mystery thriller film directed by Roy Chow
 Murderer (play), a 1975 comedy/thriller  play written by Anthony Shaffer
 "Murderer" (song), a 2003 EP by Low
 "Murderer", a song by Krisiun on the album Works of Carnage
 "The Murderer", a 1953 short story  by Ray Bradbury
 "Murderers", a song by John Frusciante on the 2001 album To Record Only Water for Ten Days
 Murderers (film), a 2006 film

See also
 List of types of murder
 Murder (disambiguation)